Maryland's Legislative District 20 is one of 47 districts in the state for the Maryland General Assembly. It covers parts of Anne Arundel County and Prince George's County.

Demographic characteristics
As of the 2020 United States census, the district had a population of 147,240, of whom 119,320 (81.0%) were of voting age. The racial makeup of the district was 52,417 (35.6%) White, 43,710 (29.7%) African American, 1,240 (0.8%) Native American, 15,501 (10.5%) Asian, 52 (0.0%) Pacific Islander, 19,720 (13.4%) from some other race, and 14,551 (9.9%) from two or more races. Hispanic or Latino of any race were 32,265 (21.9%) of the population.

The district had 81,968 registered voters as of October 17, 2020, of whom 16,615 (20.3%) were registered as unaffiliated, 13,362 (16.3%) were registered as Republicans, 49,831 (60.8%) were registered as Democrats, and 1,663 (2.0%) were registered to other parties.

Political representation
The district is represented for the 2023–2027 legislative term in the State Senate by James Rosapepe (D) and in the House of Delegates by Ben Barnes (D), Mary A. Lehman (D) and Joseline Peña-Melnyk (D).

References

Anne Arundel County, Maryland
Prince George's County, Maryland
21
21